Kumaran Institute Of Technology is one of the self-financing engineering colleges affiliated to Anna University Tamil Nadu and approved by AICTE. It is located in Minjur, Thiruvallur District, Chennai.

References 

Engineering colleges in Tamil Nadu
Colleges affiliated to Anna University
Education in Tiruvallur district
Educational institutions established in 2012
2012 establishments in Tamil Nadu